is the 19th single by Japanese idol duo Wink. Written by Maki Ohguro and Tetsurō Oda, the single was released on September 8, 1993, by Polystar Records.

Background and release 
"Sakihokore Itoshisa yo" was used by Shiseido for their "Premier" commercials featuring Wink. 

"Sakihokore Itoshisa yo" peaked at No. 9 on the Oricon's weekly charts, becoming the duo's final top-10 release. It sold over 337,000 copies and was certified Gold by the RIAJ.

Track listing

Chart positions 
Weekly charts

Year-end charts

Certifications

References

External links 
 
 

1993 singles
1993 songs
Wink (duo) songs
Japanese-language songs